1899 in sports describes the year's events in world sport.

American football
College championship
 College football national championship – Harvard Crimson

Professional championships
 Western Pennsylvania champions – Duquesne Country and Athletic Club

Events
 The 1899 Sewanee Tigers football team goes undefeated, 12–0, including five road wins in six days over top teams.

Association football
England
 The Football League – Aston Villa 45 points, Liverpool 43, Burnley 39, Everton 38, Notts County 37, Blackburn Rovers 36
 FA Cup final – Sheffield United 4–1 Derby County at Crystal Palace, London.
France
 Foundation of Olympique de Marseille
 Lyon Olympique Universitaire, as predecessor for Olympique Lyonnais, officially founded.
Germany
 Foundation of TSG 1899 Hoffenheim, Eintracht Frankfurt and SV Werder Bremen
Hungary
 Ferencváros TC was founded in suburb of Budapest on May 3.
Italy
 Foundation of A.C. Milan as the Milan Associazione Calcio (Milan Association Football).
Scotland
 Scottish Football League – Rangers
 Scottish Cup – Celtic 2–0 Rangers
Spain
 29 November — FC Barcelona founded by a Swiss, Hans Gamper, who wants to establish football in the city.
Uruguay
 Club Nacional of Montevideo was founded in Montevideo.

Athletics
USA Outdoor Track and Field Championships
Lawrence Brignolia won the third running of the Boston Marathon

Australian rules football
VFL Premiership
 Fitzroy wins the 3rd VFL Premiership: Fitzroy 3.9 (27) d South Melbourne 3.8 (26) at Junction Oval

Baseball
National championship
 National League championship – Brooklyn Superbas.  Brooklyn's team features many former Baltimore Orioles players including Ned Hanlon, Willie Keeler, Hughie Jennings and Joe Kelley.
Events
 Cleveland Spiders finish last in the twelve-team NL and establish an all-time major league record with 134 losses in a season, 84 games behind the pennant winner and 35 games out of 11th place.   The team plays 113 games on the road, losing a record 102.  They are dropped during the off-season when the National League contracts from twelve to eight teams.

Basketball
Events
 Kansas played their first men's basketball game against the Kansas City YMCA, losing 5–16. The Jayhawks were coached by the inventor of basketball James Naismith. Kansas quickly became one of the most prestigious college basketball programs in the nation.

Boxing
Lineal world champions
 World Heavyweight Championship – Bob Fitzsimmons → James J. Jeffries
 World Middleweight Championship – Tommy Ryan
 World Welterweight Championship – "Mysterious" Billy Smith
 World Lightweight Championship – George "Kid" Lavigne → Frank Erne
 World Featherweight Championship – George Dixon
 World Bantamweight Championship – Jimmy Barry → Barry retires undefeated → "Terrible" Terry McGovern → title vacant after McGovern moves up a weight

Cricket
Events
 Four of the five Test matches in the 1899 Ashes series are drawn.  Australia wins the Second Test at Lord's to take the series 1–0, their first series win in England since the original Ashes match in 1882. 
 W G Grace makes his final appearance for England in Test cricket in the First Test at Trent Bridge.  In the same match, Wilfred Rhodes makes his Test debut.
 Worcestershire becomes the fifteenth team in the County Championship, debuting with an 11-run loss to Yorkshire despite earning a 78-run lead on first innings. They eventually finished twelfth with two wins in 12 games. 
 W G Grace plays his last first-class game for Gloucestershire, having fallen out with them over his involvement with London County.
 K S Ranjitsinhji becomes the first batsman to score 3000 runs in a season.
England
 County Championship – Surrey
 Minor Counties Championship – Buckinghamshire and Northamptonshire share the title
 Most runs – K S Ranjitsinhji 3159 @ 63.18 (HS 197)
 Most wickets – Albert Trott 239 @ 17.09 (BB 8–64)
 Wisden Five Cricketers of the Season – Joe Darling, Clem Hill, Arthur Jones, Monty Noble, Robert Poore  
Australia
 Sheffield Shield – Victoria
 Most runs – Victor Trumper 873 @ 62.35 (HS 292*)
 Most wickets – Ernie Jones 45 @ 27.53 (BB 6–154)
India
 Bombay Presidency – Europeans
South Africa
 Currie Cup – not contested
West Indies
 Inter-Colonial Tournament – not contested

Cycling
Road racing
 Bordeaux–Paris road race won by Constant Huret

Figure skating
World Figure Skating Championships
 World Men's Champion – Gustav Hügel (Austria)

Golf
Major tournaments
 British Open – Harry Vardon
 U.S. Open – Willie Smith
Other tournaments
 British Amateur – John Ball
 US Amateur – H. M. Harriman

Horse racing
England
 Grand National – Manifesto
 1,000 Guineas Stakes – Sibola
 2,000 Guineas Stakes – Flying Fox
 The Derby – Flying Fox
 The Oaks – Musa
 St. Leger Stakes – Flying Fox
Australia
 Melbourne Cup – Merriwee
Canada
 Queen's Plate – Butter Scotch
Ireland
 Irish Grand National – Princess Hilda
 Irish Derby Stakes – Oppressor
USA
 Kentucky Derby – Manuel
 Preakness Stakes – Half Time
 Belmont Stakes – Hindus

Ice hockey
Stanley Cup
 15–18 February — Montreal Victorias wins its fifth Stanley Cup, defeating Winnipeg Victorias in a Cup challenge
 4 March — Montreal Shamrocks wins the inaugural Canadian Amateur Hockey League (CAHL) championship and takes the Stanley Cup
 14 March — Montreal Shamrocks successfully defends the title in a Cup challenge by Queen's College of Kingston, Ontario, winning 6–2.

Motor racing
Tour de France Trail
 The Tour de France Trail is held 16–24 July over a distance of 2172.5 km.  The winner is René De Knyff driving a Panhard-Levassor in a time of 44:43:39. The race is sometimes referred to in retrospect as the IV Grand Prix de l'A.C.F.
In July, James Gordon Bennett Jr. establishes the Gordon Bennett Cup challenge series. It is run 1900–1905.

Rowing
The Boat Race
 25 March — Cambridge wins the 56th Oxford and Cambridge Boat Race

Rugby league
England
 Championship – not contested
 Challenge Cup final – Oldham 19–9 Hunslet at Fallowfield Stadium, Manchester
 Lancashire League Championship – Broughton Rangers
 Yorkshire League Championship – Batley

Rugby union
Home Nations Championship
 17th Home Nations Championship series is won by Ireland

Speed skating
Speed Skating World Championships
 Men's All-round Champion – Peder Østlund (Norway)

Tennis
Events
 18 September — Cincinnati Open starts.  Today, it is the oldest tennis tournament in the United States still played in its original city, and is now known as the Western & Southern Financial Group Masters & Women's Open. The first singles champions are Nat Emerson and Myrtle McAteer.
England
 Wimbledon Men's Singles Championship – Reginald Doherty (GB) defeats Arthur Gore (GB) 1–6 4–6 6–3 6–3 6–3
 Wimbledon Women's Singles Championship – Blanche Bingley Hillyard (GB) defeats Charlotte Cooper Sterry (GB) 6–2 6–3
France
 French Men's Singles Championship – Paul Aymé (France) defeats Paul Lebreton (France): details unknown
 French Women's Singles Championship – Françoise Masson (France) wins: details unknown
USA
 American Men's Singles Championship – Malcolm Whitman (USA) defeats J. Parmly Paret (USA) 6–1 6–2 3–6 7–5
 American Women's Singles Championship – Marion Jones (USA) defeats Maud Banks (USA) 6–1 6–1 7–5

Yacht racing
America's Cup
 The New York Yacht Club retains the America's Cup as Columbia defeats British challenger Shamrock, of the Royal Ulster Yacht Club, 3 races to 0

References

 
Sports by year